Thorsten J.  Pattberg (born 1977 in Hamm) is a German philologist and cultural critic from Peking University. He is the author of the East-West Dichotomy.

Background 
Pattberg studied Asian Studies and Sanskrit at the University of Edinburgh and Linguistics at Fudan University and Peking University. He is a former Researcher at the University of Tokyo and Harvard University. He received his PhD degree from Peking University in 2012. He is a disciple of Ji Xianlin and Tu Weiming.

Research 
Pattberg's research focuses on Translation Studies, in particular linguistic imperialism, the competition between cultural key terminologies, and the resulting sovereignty over the definition of thought. He considers the translation of cultural key terminologies as cause for concern over that culture's legitimacy and intellectual property right. In his book Shengren, Pattberg describes the Chinese term Shengren found in Confucianism as a unique, non-European archetype of wisdom, comparable to "Bodhisattva" or "Buddha" found in Buddhism.

Possible Antisemitism and Conspiracy Theories 
Pattberg uses his personal blog to spread conspiracy theories, as well as antisemitic, racialist and racist views. For instance, he describes East Asian people as “extreme outliers in cognitive abilities.” He further claims that mass migration from Africa will set European “civilization back to the neolithic age.” He describes European and American countries as “terror states”, as “most censorious and domineering”, and their “caged people” as receiving “Jewish marching orders.” His Twitter account links the supposed “Great Reset” to Hitlerism and likens LGBT parenting to Sodom and Gomorrah.

Chinese Government Affiliation 
Pattberg was broadcast on Chinese state media Beijing Television BTV as the originator for Key Concepts in Chinese Thought and Culture under the auspices of Vice Premier Liu Yandong and CCP General Secretary Xi Jinping. According to the State Council's official website, the aim is to disseminate Chinese concepts and political doctrine via Hanban, the Office of Chinese Language Council International, academic exchanges, Western publishers such as Springer and the Confucius Institutes. Pattberg writes anti-Western propaganda for China Daily, Beijing Review, Global Times and other state media, claiming, among other things, that "no power in history has ever attained greatness by being a democracy."

Literature 
 The East-West Dichotomy: The Conceptual Contrast Between Eastern and Western Cultures. Beijing: Foreign Languages Press. 2013. .
 Shengren: Beyond Philosophy and Above Religion. New York: LoD Press. 2011. .
 "Lingualism: A New Frontier in Culture Studies". Asia Pacific World. Tokyo: Berghahn. Vol. 4, No. 1, pp. 32–35. 2013

Essays 
 Language Imperialism: "Democracy" in China. The Japan Times. Tokyo. Nov 17, 2011.
 Translation Distort the Reality. China Daily. Beijing. Feb 22, 2013.
 Western Translations Distort China's Reality. The Korea Herald. Seoul. Apr 30, 2013.
The End of Translation. Asia Times. Hong Kong. Sep 29, 2012.

Interviews 
 Knowledge is a Polyglot: The Future of Global Language. Big Think. New York. Oct 23, 2013.
 China and the West Grow Closer through Higher Education Cooperation. China Today. Beijing. Sep 25, 2013.

References

External links 

 
 Thorsten Pattberg at Peking University (archived 2013)
 The East-West dichotomy: The Conceptual Contrast between Eastern and Western Cultures

German philologists
Academic staff of Peking University
1977 births
Living people
German expatriates in China
Alumni of the University of Edinburgh
Fudan University alumni
Peking University alumni